Tell Me About Tomorrow is the debut studio album by American singer and social media personality Jxdn, released through Travis Barker's label, DTA Records, on July 2, 2021.

Background and recording 
Jxdn self-released his debut single "Comatose" in February 2020, which caught the attention of Travis Barker who would later sign him to his label DTA Records.  After being signed, Jxdn released the single "Angels & Demons" in May 2020 which would serve as the first single from the album.  This was followed by the release of the singles "So What!" in July 2020, and "Tonight", featuring Iann Dior, in October 2020.

Jxdn announced the title of the album alongside the release of "Better Off Dead" on December 18, 2020.

On June 4, 2021, Jxdn announced the track listing and release date for the album alongside the album's fifth single, "Think About Me".

The album was released alongside the single and music video for "Wanna Be", featuring Machine Gun Kelly, on July 2, 2021.

With four new tracks, the deluxe edition of the album was released on December 10, 2021.

Themes and influences 
Tell Me About Tomorrows themes focus on growing up and dealing with mental health and self-reflection. Jxdn stated that he has spoken about his experiences with depression and suicidal ideation. The album's sound is heavily inspired by Taking Back Sunday and blink-182.

"A Wasted Year" is related to the hardships caused by the COVID-19 pandemic. It features a chorus similar to "Feeling This" by blink-182. The track is described by Hossler as a "a mix between the charisma of Taking Back Sunday and the simplicity of Bleach".

 Critical reception 

The Aquarian Weekly reviewer Debra Kate Schafer praised the album, stating that it is "fiery in musicality and lyrically poignant", and compared its stylings to "All the Small Things" by blink-182 and "Welcome to Paradise" by Green Day. Writing for Nylon, Sophia June named the record "a collection of earworm pop-punk with propulsive rock guitars and sludgy vocals with pop-punk’s quintessential suburban emo cadence" that "shows that he’s only getting started."

Conversely, Pitchfork reviewer Dani Blum gave the album a negative review and criticized Jxdn's lack of personality on the album, stating "the record tells us nothing about who he is, only who he wants to emulate".  Blum went on to say that the fact that Jxdn is new to the punk genre is prominent on the album and criticized the album's multiple mentions of being a rock star, calling it "self-serious satisfaction" alongside declaring the writing as "clunky" and detrimental to the project's purported purpose of raising mental health awareness.

 Track listing Notes'
 Song titles are stylized in all uppercase.

Personnel 
 Jaden Hossler – vocals
 Travis Barker – production, drums
 Machine Gun Kelly – additional vocals (track 4)
 Iann Dior – additional vocals (track 10)

Charts

References

2021 debut albums
Jxdn albums
Albums produced by Andrew Goldstein (musician)
Albums produced by Blackbear (musician)
Albums produced by Keith Varon
Albums produced by Travis Barker
DTA Records albums
Elektra Records albums